The Caledonian Railway 294 and 711 Classes (nicknamed "Jumbo") were 0-6-0 steam locomotives designed by  Dugald Drummond for the Caledonian Railway (CR) and introduced in 1883. After Drummond's retirement, construction of the class continued under Smellie, Lambie and McIntosh.

Ownership changes
All 244 locomotives survived to be absorbed by the London, Midland and Scottish Railway (LMS) in 1923 and 238 survived into British Railways (BR) ownership in 1948.

Numbering

294 Class

711 Class

The BR number series are not continuous because some locomotives were withdrawn before 1948.

See also
 Locomotives of the Caledonian Railway

References

259
0-6-0 locomotives
Railway locomotives introduced in 1883
Scrapped locomotives
Railway Operating Division locomotives